The 2011–12 LNB Pro A season is the 90th season of the French Basketball Championship and the 25th season since inception of the Ligue Nationale de Basketball (LNB). The regular season starts on October 7, 2011 and ends on May 16, 2012. The play-offs are held from May 23, 2012 until  June 16, 2012.

Promotion and relegation

Team Arenas

Regular season

Team standings

Season Team leader(s)

Stats Leaders

Playoffs 

This was the last season in which the championship final was contested as a one-off match. Starting in 2012–13, the final became a best-of-5 series.

Awards

Regular Season MVPs 
 Foreign MVP :  Blake Schilb (Chalon-sur-Saône)
 French MVP :  Fabien Causeur (Cholet)

Finals MVP 
  Blake Schilb (Chalon-sur-Saône)

Best Coach 
  Gregor Beugnot (Chalon-sur-Saône)

Most Improved Player 
  Evan Fournier (Poitiers)

Best Defensive Player 
  Andrew Albicy (Gravelines-Dunkerque)

Rising Star Award 
  Evan Fournier (Poitiers)

Player of the month

References

External links 
  LNB website

LNB Pro A seasons
French
basketball
basketball